Anga Lipi (𑂃𑂁𑂏) was a historical writing system. The Anga Lipi finds its mention in the Buddhist text "Lalitvistar" which says Anga lipi was the one of the script among the 64 scripts known to Lord Budhha.

Etymology and history
The Anga Script is mentioned in an ancient Sanskrit language Buddhist book the "Lalitvistar", which names Anga Lipi relatively early in the list of 64 scripts known to the Buddha. Arthur Coke Burnell thought that some of the sixty-four scripts mentioned in "Lalitvistar" were mythical, but he considered some, including Dravid, Anga and Banga, to be real, though not appearing as distinct alphabets until the 9th or 10th century CE. (Burnell regarded this passage as a late interpolation.)

Characteristics and comparison
Anga Lipi and Bengali script might have been derived from Brahmic, with some regional characteristics. This supports the belief that the development of local characteristics in alphabets was continuing from earlier times.

It reflects the early development of local variants of Indian alphabets.

See also
Brahmic family of scripts
Brāhmī script
Bengali-Assamese script
Kaithi
Abugida
List of writing systems
List of languages by first written accounts
Angika
Middle Indo-Aryan languages

References

External links
 angika.com

History of writing
Linguistic history of India
Brahmic scripts